The first season of the television series Got to Believe  premiered in the Philippines on August 26, 2013 with an audience share of 34% as reported in Kantar Media Nationwide TV Ratings. It officially ended on January 21, 2014 and contained 107 episodes which include a shortened telecast on September 27 due to technical difficulties.

The show is consistent on utilizing the micro-blogging site Twitter as one of its contributing writer dutifully sends the official hashtag for each day which is also the episode title appearing at the intertitle before a commercial break. Some notable hashtags were #G2BDanceWithMe for the November 26 telecast and #G2BUntilThen, the season ender episode which left the audience with a heartbreaking climax.

Series overview and Ratings
{| class="wikitable plainrowheaders" style="text-align: center;"
|- class="wikitable" style="text-align: center;"
! style="padding: 0 8px;" colspan="2"| Month
! style="padding: 0 8px;" | Episodes
! style="padding: 0 8px;" | Peak
! style="padding: 0 8px;" | Average Rating
! style="padding: 0 8px;" | Rank
|-
|style="padding: 0 8px; background:#128a50;"| 
| ' style="padding: 0 8px;" |August 2013
|  style="padding: 0 8px;" |5
|  style="padding: 0 8px;" |34.3%  (Episode 2)
|  style="padding: 0 8px;" |32.4%
|  style="padding: 0 8px;" |#3
|-
|style="padding: 0 8px; background:#a88109;"| 
| ' style="padding: 0 8px;" |September 2013
|  style="padding: 0 8px;" |21
|  style="padding: 0 8px;" |32.5%  (Episode 6)
|  style="padding: 0 8px;" |29.6%
|  style="padding: 0 8px;" |#5
|-
|style="padding: 0 8px; background:#096aa8;"| 
| ' style="padding: 0 8px;" |October 2013
|  style="padding: 0 8px;" |23
|  style="padding: 0 8px;" |33.4% (Episode 29)
|  style="padding: 0 8px;" |29.2%
|  style="padding: 0 8px;" |#6
|-
|style="padding: 0 8px; background:#4f1409;"| 
| ' style="padding: 0 8px;" |November 2013
|  style="padding: 0 8px;" |21
|  style="padding: 0 8px;" |28.4% (Episode 52)
|  style="padding: 0 8px;" |25.2%
|  style="padding: 0 8px;" |#5
|-
|style="padding: 0 8px; background:#566e76;"| 
| ' style="padding: 0 8px;" |December 2013
|  style="padding: 0 8px;" |22
|  style="padding: 0 8px;" |28.5% (Episode 74)
|  style="padding: 0 8px;" |27.7%
|  style="padding: 0 8px; color: gray"|TBA
|  style="padding: 0 8px; color: gray"|TBA
|-
|style="padding: 0 8px; background:#ce5491;"| 
| ' style="padding: 0 8px;" |January 2014
|  style="padding: 0 8px;"|23
|  style="padding: 0 8px;"|33.4% (Episode 114)
|  style="padding: 0 8px;" |33.1%
|  style="padding: 0 8px; color: gray"|TBA
|  style="padding: 0 8px; color: gray"|TBA
|}

Episodes

August 2013

September 2013

October 2013

November 2013

December 2013

January 2014

References 

2013 Philippine television seasons
2014 Philippine television seasons